A list of Western films released in the 1990s.

TV series of the 1990s

1990
Western